Pachyodontus languidus is a species of beetle in the family Carabidae, the only species in the genus Pachyodontus.

References

Scaritinae